Air Force One is the official air traffic control designated call sign for a United States Air Force aircraft carrying the president of the United States. In common parlance, the term is used to denote U.S. Air Force aircraft modified and used to transport the president and a metonym for the primary presidential aircraft, VC-25, although it can be used to refer to any Air Force aircraft the president travels on.

The idea of designating specific military aircraft to transport the president arose during World War II when military advisors in the War Department were concerned about the risk of using commercial airlines for presidential travel. A C-54 Skymaster was then converted for presidential use; dubbed the Sacred Cow, it carried President Franklin D. Roosevelt to the Yalta Conference in February 1945 and was used for another two years by President Harry S. Truman.

The "Air Force One" call sign was created in 1953, after a Lockheed Constellation carrying President Dwight D. Eisenhower entered the same airspace as a commercial airline flight using the same flight number. Since the introduction of SAM 26000 in 1962, the primary presidential aircraft has carried the distinctive livery designed by Raymond Loewy.

Other aircraft designated as Air Force One have included another Lockheed Constellation, Columbine III, three Boeing 707s, introduced in the 1960s and 1970s, and the current Boeing VC-25As. Since 1990, the presidential fleet has consisted of two highly customized Boeing 747-200B (VC-25A) aircraft. The USAF has ordered two Boeing 747-8s to serve as the next presidential aircraft, with designation VC-25B.

History

Background

On 11 October 1910, Theodore Roosevelt became the first US president to fly in an aircraft, an early Wright Flyer from Kinloch Field near St. Louis, Missouri. He was no longer in office at the time, having been succeeded by William Howard Taft. The record-making occasion was a brief overflight of the crowd at a county fair but was nonetheless the beginning of presidential air travel.

First presidential aircraft
Franklin D. Roosevelt was the first president to fly in an aircraft while in office. The first aircraft obtained specifically for presidential travel was a Douglas Dolphin amphibian delivered in 1933 which was designated RD-2 by the US Navy and based at the naval base at Anacostia D.C. The Dolphin was modified with luxury upholstery for four passengers and a small separate sleeping compartment. The aircraft remained in service as a presidential transport from 1933 until 1939. During World War II, Roosevelt traveled on the Dixie Clipper, a Pan Am-crewed Boeing 314 flying boat to the 1943 Casablanca Conference in Morocco, a flight that covered 5,500 miles (8,890 km) in three legs. The threat from the German submarines throughout the Battle of the Atlantic made air travel the preferred method of VIP transatlantic transportation.

Concerned about relying upon commercial airlines to transport the president, officials of the United States Army Air Forces, the predecessor to the US Air Force, ordered the conversion of a military aircraft to accommodate the special needs of the commander-in-chief. The first dedicated aircraft proposed for presidential use was a C-87A VIP transport aircraft. This aircraft, number 41-24159, was modified in 1943 for use as a presidential VIP transport, the Guess Where II, intended to carry President Franklin D. Roosevelt on international trips.  Had it been accepted, it would have been the first aircraft to be used in presidential service. After a review of the C-87's highly controversial safety record in service, the Secret Service flatly refused to approve the Guess Where II for presidential carriage.  As the C-87 was a derivative of the Consolidated B-24 Liberator bomber, it presented strong offensive impressions to enemy fighter aircraft as well as foreign destinations visited, an issue not present with airplanes that were used purely for transport. The Guess Where II was used to transport senior members of the Roosevelt administration on various trips. In March 1944, it transported Eleanor Roosevelt on a goodwill tour of several Latin American countries. The C-87 was scrapped in 1945.

The Secret Service subsequently reconfigured a Douglas C-54 Skymaster for presidential transport duty. The VC-54C aircraft, nicknamed the Sacred Cow, included a sleeping area, radiotelephone, and retractable battery powered elevator to lift Roosevelt in his wheelchair. As modified, the VC-54C was used by President Roosevelt only once before his death, on his trip to the Yalta Conference in February 1945.

Late 1940s and 1950s

The National Security Act of 1947, the legislation that created the US Air Force, was signed by President Harry S. Truman while on board the VC-54C. He replaced the VC-54C in 1947 with a modified C-118 Liftmaster, calling it the Independence after his Missouri hometown. It was given a distinctive exterior, as its nose was painted like the head of a bald eagle. The plane, which included a stateroom in the aft fuselage and a main cabin that could seat 24 passengers or could be made up into 12 sleeper berths, is now housed at the National Museum of the United States Air Force in Dayton, Ohio.

Eisenhower introduced four propeller-driven aircraft to presidential service. This group included two Lockheed C-121 Constellations, aircraft Columbine II (VC-121A 48-610) and Columbine III (VC-121E 53-7885). They were named by First Lady Mamie Eisenhower for the columbine, official state flower of her adopted home state of Colorado. In addition, two Aero Commanders were also added to the fleet.

Columbine II is the first plane to bear the call sign Air Force One. This designation for the US Air Force aircraft carrying the incumbent president was established after an incident in 1953, when Eastern Air Lines 8610, a commercial flight, crossed paths with Air Force 8610, which was carrying President Eisenhower. Initially used informally, the designation became official in 1962.

Boeing 707s and entry to jet age

Toward the end of Eisenhower's second term, Secretary of State John Foster Dulles commented that Soviet Premier Nikita Khrushchev and other senior Soviet officials had begun using the technologically advanced Tupolev Tu-114 aircraft for their travels, and it was no longer dignified for the president to fly in a propeller-driven aircraft. This paved the way for the Air Force's initial procurement of three Boeing 707-120 (VC-137A) jet aircraft, designated SAM (Special Air Missions) 970, 971 and 972.

The high-speed jet technology built into these aircraft enabled presidents from Eisenhower through Nixon to travel long distances more quickly for face-to-face meetings with world leaders. Then-Vice President Richard Nixon first used a VC-137A on his visit to Russia in July 1959 for the Kitchen Debates. The following month, Eisenhower became the first president to fly via jet airplane when he used SAM 970, nicknamed "Queenie", to meet German Chancellor Konrad Adenauer. During Eisenhower's "Flight to Peace" goodwill tour in December 1959, he visited 11 Asian nations, flying  in 19 days, twice as fast as he could have covered that distance in one of the Columbines.

SAM 970 to SAM 972 would be removed from the presidential role with the early-1960s arrival of the specially built VC-137C designated SAM 26000. The older planes would be repainted in the Loewy secondary livery designed for Air Force Two and other non-presidential VIP aircraft. SAM 970 is now on display at The Museum of Flight in Seattle, Washington. SAM 971, best remembered for returning the Americans held during the Iran hostage crisis in 1981, is on display at the Pima Air and Space Museum in Tucson, Arizona. SAM 972 was scrapped in October 1996.

Loewy's livery design

The new VC-137C was not yet modified for presidential service when John F. Kennedy took office in 1961. On the recommendation of his wife, Jacqueline Kennedy, he contacted the French-born American industrial designer Raymond Loewy for help in designing new livery and interiors for the VC-137C.

Loewy, who had seen SAM 970, complained to a friend in the White House that it "had a garish orange nose and looked too much like a military plane", Air Force One historian and former Smithsonian curator Von Hardesty told CNN. He offered Kennedy his design consultation services free of charge.

Kennedy chose a red-and-gold design from one of Loewy's initial concept sketches, and asked him to render the design all in blue. Loewy also drew inspiration from the first printed copy of the United States Declaration of Independence, suggesting the widely spaced and upper case "United States of America" legend in Caslon typeface. He chose to expose the polished aluminum fuselage on the bottom side and used two blues – steel blue  associated with the early republic and the presidency and a more contemporary water blue —to represent an America both rooted in the past and flying inexorably into the future. The presidential seal was added to both sides of the fuselage near the nose and a large American flag was painted on the tail. Loewy's work won immediate praise from the president and the press. The cheatline suggested a sleek and horizontal image that mirrored America's Jet Age optimism and prosperity of the era, and today signifies its legacy and tradition.

Loewy's VC-137C livery was adapted for the larger VC-25A when it entered service in 1990, and the secondary variation (without the darker blue cheatline and cap over the cockpit) is still in use on USAF C-40, C-37, C-32, and C-20 aircraft in standard (non-presidential) VIP configurations. The presidential paint scheme can also be seen on Union Pacific 4141, the locomotive used in George H. W. Bush's funeral train.

SAM 26000

Under John F. Kennedy, presidential air travel entered the jet age. Although he could use the Eisenhower-era jets for trips to Canada, France, Austria, and the United Kingdom, when he came into office, his primary aircraft domestically was still a prop powered Douglas VC-118A Liftmaster. In October 1962, the modified long-range Boeing VC-137C Stratoliner SAM 26000, featuring livery designed by Loewy would be delivered, and immediately became an important element of the Kennedy administration's brand.

SAM 26000 was in service from 1962 to 1998, serving Presidents Kennedy to Clinton. On 22 November 1963, SAM 26000 carried President Kennedy to Dallas, Texas, where it served as the backdrop as the Kennedys greeted well-wishers at Dallas's Love Field. Later that afternoon, Kennedy was assassinated, and Vice President Lyndon Johnson assumed the office of President and took the oath of office aboard SAM 26000. On Johnson's orders, the plane carried Kennedy's body back to Washington. A decade later, SAM 26000 took Johnson's body home to Texas after his state funeral in Washington.

The Air Force usually does not have fighter aircraft escort the presidential aircraft over the United States but it has occurred. The first instance came during the state funeral of John F. Kennedy when it was followed by 50 fighters (20 Navy and 30 Air Force), representing the states of the union.

Johnson used SAM 26000 to travel extensively domestically and to visit troops in South Vietnam during the Vietnam War. SAM 26000 served President Nixon on several groundbreaking overseas voyages, including his famous visit to the People's Republic of China in February 1972 and his trip to the Soviet Union later that year, both firsts for an American president. Nixon dubbed the plane the "Spirit of '76" in honor of the forthcoming bicentennial of the United States; that logo was painted on both sides of the plane's nose.

SAM 27000

SAM 26000 was replaced in December 1972 by another VC-137C, Special Air Mission 27000, although SAM 26000 was relegated to non-presidential VIP status (and repainted without the darker blue cap and cheatline), it served as a backup to SAM 27000 until it was finally retired in 1998.

In June 1974, while President Nixon was on his way to a scheduled stop in Syria, Syrian fighter jets intercepted Air Force One to act as escorts. The crew was not informed in advance, so took evasive action including a dive.

After announcing his intention to resign the presidency, Nixon boarded SAM 27000 (with call sign "Air Force One") to travel to California. Colonel Ralph Albertazzie, then pilot of Air Force One, recounted that after Gerald Ford was sworn in as president, the plane had to be redesignated as SAM 27000, indicating no president was on board the aircraft. Over Jefferson City, Missouri, Albertazzie radioed: "Kansas City, this was Air Force One. Will you change our call sign to Sierra Alpha Mike (SAM) 27000?" Back came the reply: "Roger, Sierra Alpha Mike 27000. Good luck to the President."

Boeing VC-25A

Though Ronald Reagan's two terms as president saw no major changes to Air Force One, the manufacture of the presidential aircraft version of the 747 began during his presidency. The USAF issued a Request For Proposal in 1985 for two wide-body aircraft with a minimum of three engines and an unrefueled range of 6,000 miles (9,700 km). Boeing with the 747 and McDonnell Douglas with the DC-10 submitted proposals, and the Reagan Administration ordered two identical 747s to replace the aging 707 VC-137 variants he used. The interior designs, drawn up by First Lady Nancy Reagan, were reminiscent of the American Southwest.

9/11 to present

On 11 September 2001, President George W. Bush was interrupted as he attended an event at Emma E. Booker Elementary School in Sarasota, Florida, after an airplane hit the South Tower of the World Trade Center in New York City. He took off on a VC-25 from Sarasota-Bradenton International Airport with Colonel Mark Tillman, the senior pilot of Air Force One that day, in charge. Air traffic controllers gave Air Force One an ominous warning that a passenger jet was close to Air Force One and was unresponsive to calls. Tillman recalls: "As we got over Gainesville, Florida, we got the word from Jacksonville Center. They said, 'Air Force One you have traffic behind you and basically above you that is descending into you, we are not in contact with them – they have shut their responder off.' And at that time it kind of led us to believe maybe someone was coming into us in Sarasota, they saw us take off, they just stayed high and are following us at this point. We had no idea what the capabilities of the terrorists were at that point."

In response to this reported threat, Col. Tillman said he flew Air Force One over the Gulf of Mexico to test whether the other aircraft would follow. The other jet continued on its route, and Tillman said that it was later explained to him that an airliner had lost its transponder, which normally broadcasts an electronic identification signal, and that the pilots on board neglected to switch to another radio frequency.  A threat came again when Tillman received a message warning of an imminent attack on Air Force One. "We got word from the vice president and the staff that 'Angel was next,' indicating the classified call sign for Air Force One. Once we got into the Gulf [of Mexico] and they passed to us that 'Angel was next,' at that point I asked for fighter support. If an airliner was part of the attack, it would be good to have fighters on the wing to go ahead and take care of us." At this point, Tillman said that the plan to fly the president back to Washington, D.C., was aborted and instead Tillman landed at Barksdale Air Force Base, Louisiana, and Offutt Air Force Base, Nebraska, where the president made a speech. Tillman explained that this was due to his concern that because of the reported threat, Air Force One would be attacked when he returned to Andrews Air Force Base.

After the preliminary stops, the president was returned to Washington. The next day, officials at the White House and the Justice Department explained that President Bush did this because there was "specific and credible information that the White House and Air Force One were also intended targets". The White House could not confirm evidence of a threat made against Air Force One, and investigation found the original claim to be a result of miscommunication.

Other uses

Presidents have invited other world leaders to travel with them on Air Force One at times, including Nixon inviting Soviet general secretary Leonid Brezhnev to travel with him to California from Washington, D.C. in June 1973. In 1983, President Reagan and Queen Elizabeth II toured the US West Coast aboard Air Force One. In March 2012, President Obama took British prime minister David Cameron to a basketball game in Ohio aboard Air Force One.

When President Bush came to the end of his second term in January 2009, a VC-25 was used to transport him to Texas. For this purpose the aircraft call sign was SAM 28000, as the aircraft did not carry the current president of the United States. Similar arrangements were made for former presidents Ronald Reagan, Bill Clinton, and Barack Obama. President Donald Trump flew to his Mar-a-Lago estate shortly before his tenure as president ended, under the Air Force One call sign.

On 27 April 2009, a low-flying VC-25 circled New York City for a photo-op and training exercise and caused a scare for many in New York.

In the 2023 visit by Joe Biden to Ukraine, to increase secrecy the Air Force One call sign was not used for the C-32 aircraft used to transport Biden to Poland; instead the call sign was SAM060.

Planned replacement

VC-25B

The VC-25As are to be replaced as the cost of maintaining the aging systems on their 30-year-old airframes and less efficient GE-CF6 engines has begun to surpass the cost of acquiring a new aircraft. On 28 January 2015, the Air Force announced that the Boeing 747-8 would be the next presidential aircraft.  On 6 December 2016, President-elect Donald Trump tweeted his opposition to the Air Force One replacement because of its high cost, "more than $4 billion". The US Government Accountability Office estimated the total cost at $3.2 billion, and the US Air Force's budget for the program is projected to be nearly $4 billion.  In December 2016, Boeing was on contract for preliminary development worth $170 million.

On 1 August 2017, Defense One reported that, in an effort to pay less for the replacement program, the US Air Force contracted to purchase two of the bankrupt Russian airline Transaero's undelivered 747-8 Intercontinentals from Boeing, which was storing them in the Mojave Desert to prevent corrosion. These airplanes, which were flight-tested but never delivered, are to be retrofitted with telecommunications and security equipment to bring them to the required security level of presidential aircraft, but without the aerial refueling capability originally requested as the structural reinforcements necessary cannot be retrofitted onto an existing airframe.

Supersonic aircraft
In September 2020, the US Air force announced several Presidential and Executive Airlift Directorate contracts signed with aircraft manufacturers to begin development of a supersonic aircraft that could function as Air Force One. Contracts have been signed with Exosonic, Hermeus, and Boom.

Other presidential aircraft

During the Johnson Administration, the United States Air Force acquired a Beechcraft King Air B90 which was designated VC-6A (66-7943). The aircraft was used to transport President Johnson between Bergstrom Air Force Base and his family ranch near Johnson City, Texas, and was used at least once to transport the President to Princeton, New Jersey. It was referred to as Lady Bird's airplane and later in its service life featured a basic color scheme similar to civilian aircraft. When the President was aboard, the aircraft used the call sign Air Force One.

United Airlines is the only commercial airline to have operated Executive One, the call sign given to a civilian flight on which the US president is aboard. On 26 December 1973, President Richard Nixon and his family flew as commercial passengers on a United DC-10 from Washington Dulles to Los Angeles International Airport. His staff explained that this was done to conserve fuel by not having to fly the usual Boeing 707 Air Force aircraft.

In November 1999, President Bill Clinton flew from Ankara, Turkey, to Cengiz Topel Naval Air Station outside Izmit, Turkey, aboard a marked C-20C (Gulfstream III) using the call sign Air Force One, escorted by three F-16s.

On March 8, 2000, President Clinton flew to Pakistan aboard an unmarked Gulfstream III while another aircraft with the call sign Air Force One flew on the same route a few minutes later. This diversion was reported by several US press outlets.

On May 1, 2003, President George W. Bush flew in the co-pilot seat of a Sea Control Squadron Thirty-Five (VS-35) S-3B Viking from Naval Air Station North Island, California to the aircraft carrier USS Abraham Lincoln off the California coast, where Bush delivered his "Mission Accomplished" speech. During the flight, the aircraft used the call sign of "Navy One" for the first time.  This aircraft is now on display at the National Naval Aviation Museum at Naval Air Station Pensacola, Florida.

Barack Obama used the Gulfstream C-37 variant on a personal trip in 2009 to visit the production of August Wilson's Joe Turner's Come and Gone in New York.

Several Boeing C-17 Globemaster IIIs typically accompany the president whenever he travels, carrying the presidential limousines and other support vehicles, and have been rumored to have discreetly transported presidents and vice presidents in and out of Iraq and Afghanistan without using the Air Force One call sign.

When required by circumstances, the president makes domestic flights using the  Boeing C-32 narrow body jet, sometimes to allow access to smaller airports that cannot support the larger VC-25. Alternatively, vice presidents have used a VC-25 on longer trips, which then uses the Air Force Two call sign instead.

The president regularly flies in helicopters (call sign Marine One) operated by the US Marine Corps.

Aircraft on display

A Lockheed JetStar which was used by Lyndon Johnson during his presidency is on display at the LBJ Ranch (now the Lyndon B. Johnson National Historical Park) in Stonewall, Texas. The ranch had a runway, but was too small to accommodate a large plane such as a Boeing 707. President Johnson would take the larger Air Force One to Bergstrom AFB in Austin, where he would transfer to the smaller JetStar for the short flight to the ranch.

A McDonnell Douglas VC-9C used by Ronald Reagan and Bill Clinton is on display at Castle Air Museum in Atwater, California, adjacent to the former Castle Air Force Base. Another VC-9C has been at DAFB Air Mobility Command Museum in Dover, DE since 2011.

In pop culture

Air Force One is shown equipped with a one-person escape pod and parachutes for emergency use by the president of the United States in Air Force One. In reality, it has neither.

See also

References

Notes

Bibliography

External links

 VC-25 – Air Force One Fact Sheet on US Air Force site
 SAM 26000 fact sheet on the National Museum of the United States Air Force site
 Presidential Gallery, featuring Boeing VC-137C known as SAM (Special Air Mission) 26000
 Air Force One page on WhiteHouse.gov
 Facts and History of 707 as Air Force One and "Where they are Now?" on 707sim.com
 Air Force One page on WhiteHouseMuseum.org
 Air Force One Pavilion on ReaganFoundation.org
 Truman Library & Museum
 US Air Force image gallery
 Air Force One page on Boeing site
 Technical Order 00-105E-9, Segment 9, Chapter 7
 Air Force One page on air-force-one.fr

1953 establishments in the United States
Boeing 707
Boeing 747
call signs
presidential aircraft
Raymond Loewy
transportation of the president of the United States
United States Air Force
United States special-purpose aircraft